Two Funny Guys (Finnish: 2 hauskaa vekkulia) is a 1953 Finnish comedy film directed by Lasse Pöysti and starring Pöysti, Toini Vartiainen and Pentti Viljanen.

The film's sets were designed by Kai Lappalainen.

Cast
 Toini Vartiainen as Marja  
 Lasse Pöysti as Säveltäjä Jussi Mäki  
 Pentti Viljanen as Martti Teräs  
 Reino Valkama as Alfonso  
 Rauni Luoma as Neiti Jansson  
 Aino Angerkoski as Rouva hopeaheimo 
 Johnny Jansson as Soitto-oppilas  
 Tapio Rautavaara as Laulaja Ville  
 Annikki Tähti as Laulaja lavalla  
 Jorma Ikävalko as Laulaja lavalla 
 Kauko Kokkonen as Pianisti ja säveltäjä  
 Anton Soini as Talonmies  
 Hannes Veivo as Kanninen  
 Hilly Lindqvist 
 Elvi Saarnio as Laskun karhuaja  
 Elli Ylimaa 
 Assi Raine 
 Runar Tuurno 
 Pentti Irjala as Radioreportteri  
 Ossi Korhonen 
 Aarne Hemming as Kapellimestari fudzinsky  
 Urho Lahti 
 Eero Leväluoma 
 Joel Asikainen 
 Mauri Jaakkola 
 Kauko Vuorensola 
 Aarno Walli

References

Bibliography 
 Qvist, Per Olov & von Bagh, Peter. Guide to the Cinema of Sweden and Finland. Greenwood Publishing Group, 2000.

External links 
 

1953 films
1953 comedy films
Finnish comedy films
1950s Finnish-language films
Finnish black-and-white films